Little Inge and Her Three Fathers (German: Die kleine Inge und ihre drei Väter) is a 1926 German silent comedy film directed by Franz Osten and starring Dorothea Wieck, Oscar Marion and Harry Hardt. It was made at the Emelka Studios in Munich.

The film's sets were designed by Ludwig Reiber and Willy Reiber

Cast
Dorothea Wieck as Inge  
Oscar Marion as Jonny Paulsen  
Harry Hardt as Bob Rinks
Carl Walther Meyer as Fred Krafft  
Antoniette Hagen as Nora
Mary Brandt as Tante Nelli
Hermann Pfanz as Father

References

External links

Films of the Weimar Republic
German silent feature films
Films directed by Franz Osten
1926 comedy films
German comedy films
Bavaria Film films
German black-and-white films
Films shot at Bavaria Studios
Silent comedy films
1920s German films